Chatchu-on Moksri (born November 6, 1999 in Buriram) is a Thai indoor volleyball player. She is a current member of the Thailand women's national volleyball team.

Career
Chatchu-on moved to the Thai club Supreme Chonburi for the 2017 season, playing on loan. She played the 2014 Asian Cup finishing in fifth place and the 2014 World Championship ranking in the 17th place. She also played the 2016 World Grand Prix ending up in the ninth place.

In 2018 she played with the local Supreme Chonburi on loan.

She played in 2019 Asian Women's Club Volleyball Championship with Supreme Chonburi on loan.

Clubs
  Ayutthaya (2013–2015)
  Nonthaburi (2015–2016)
 Generali Supreme Chonburi-E.Tech (2016–2017) (loan)
  Nakhon Ratchasima (2016–2018)
 PFU BlueCats (2018–2019)
  Generali Supreme Chonburi-E.Tech (2018–2019) (loan)
 PEA Sisaket (2018–2019) (loan)
  Nakhon Ratchasima (2019–2021)
 Sarıyer Belediyespor (2021–)

Awards

Individuals
 2014 Asian U17 Championship – "Best Outside Spiker"
 2015 VTV Cup Championship – "Best Outside Spiker"
 2016 Southeast Asian U19 Championship – "Best Outside Spiker"
 2016 Southeast Asian U19 Championship – "Most Valuable Player"
 2017 Asian U23 Championship – "Best Outside Spiker"
 2017 Asian Club Championship – "Best Outside Spiker"
 2017 Asian Championship – "Best Outside Spiker"
 2017–18 Thailand League – "Best Outside Spiker"
 2018 Yeltsin Cup – "Best Server"
 2019 ASEAN Grand Prix – "Best Outside Spiker"
 2019–20 Thailand League – "Best Scorer"
 2019–20 Thailand League – "Best Outside Spiker"
 2020–21 Thailand League – "Best Scorer"
 2020–21 Thailand League – "Best Outside Spiker"
 2021 Asian Women's Club Volleyball Championship – "Best Outside Spiker"
 2022 AVC Cup – "Best Outside Spiker"

Clubs 
 2014–15 Thailand League –  Runner-up, with Ayutthaya A.T.C.C
 2017–18 Thailand League –  Runner-up, with Nakhon Ratchasima
 2014 Thai-Denmark Super League –  Champion, with Ayutthaya A.T.C.C
 2017 Asian Club Championship –  Champion, with Supreme Chonburi
 2018 Asian Club Championship –  Champion, with Supreme Chonburi
 2019 Asian Club Championship –  Runner-up, with Supreme Chonburi

References

External links
FIVB Biography

1999 births
Living people
Chatchu-on Moksri
Chatchu-on Moksri
Chatchu-on Moksri
Chatchu-on Moksri
Chatchu-on Moksri
Chatchu-on Moksri
PFU BlueCats players
Thai expatriate sportspeople in Japan
Thai expatriate sportspeople in Turkey
Expatriate volleyball players in Japan
Expatriate volleyball players in Turkey
Asian Games medalists in volleyball
Chatchu-on Moksri
Volleyball players at the 2018 Asian Games
Chatchu-on Moksri
Southeast Asian Games medalists in volleyball
Medalists at the 2018 Asian Games
Competitors at the 2015 Southeast Asian Games
Competitors at the 2017 Southeast Asian Games
Competitors at the 2019 Southeast Asian Games
Outside hitters
Chatchu-on Moksri
Competitors at the 2021 Southeast Asian Games
Chatchu-on Moksri